Te Atawhai Maurice Hudson-Wihongi (born 27 March 1995) is a New Zealand footballer who currently plays for Southern Football League Division One Central club Walthamstow. He has also played for the New Zealand national football team.

Career
Following a short stint at Canterbury United, in which he featured in just one game as a substitute against Waikato FC on 29 January 2012, Hudson-Wihongi signed for United States side Real Salt Lake on a youth contract, appearing for the club's under-18s. Following his departure, Hudson-Wihongi trialed at Scottish club Aberdeen and Italian Serie D club Padova.

After signing for Auckland City FC from the now-defunct Wanderers SC, Hudson-Wihongi scored his first goal in the Charity Cup against Team Wellington. He also represented Auckland City at the 2015 FIFA Club World Cup, and played in their 0–1 loss against hosts Sanfrecce Hiroshima.

In July 2019, Hudson-Wihongi signed a one-year professional contract with Wellington Phoenix.

In October 2022, Hudson-Wihongi moved to England to join Southern Football League Division One South club Walthamstow.

International career
Hudson-Wihongi has represented New Zealand at three different levels of international football. He represented New Zealand at the 2015 FIFA U-20 World Cup, and for the New Zealand national under-23 football team at the 2015 Pacific Games in which he scored in New Zealand's 5–0 win over New Caledonia in the group stage.

Hudson-Wihongi made his full New Zealand debut in a friendly against Oman, coming on as an 80th-minute substitute in the 1–0 win for New Zealand.

Honors

National
New Zealand
OFC Nations Cup: 2016

References

External links
 Auckland City FC profile

1995 births
Living people
Association footballers from Auckland
Association football midfielders
New Zealand association footballers
Wanderers Special Club players
Auckland City FC players
Wellington Phoenix FC players
Auckland United FC players
Walthamstow F.C. players
New Zealand Football Championship players
Southern Football League players
New Zealand international footballers
New Zealand Māori sportspeople
2016 OFC Nations Cup players
New Zealand expatriate association footballers
Expatriate footballers in England
New Zealand expatriate sportspeople in England